The 2001 Valencian Community motorcycle Grand Prix was the twelfth round of the 2001 Grand Prix motorcycle racing season. It took place on the weekend of 21–23 September 2001 at the Circuit de Valencia. Ten days after the September 11 attacks on New York and Washington D.C., Grand Prix Motorcycle Racing's governing body, the Fédération Internationale de Motocyclisme (FIM) announced that the Valencian Community Motorcycle Grand Prix would go ahead as scheduled. Additionally, the Royal Automobile Club of Spain urged fans and spectators to behave "in keeping with the gravity of the situation and in collective participation in the pain of American citizens".

500 cc classification

250 cc classification
The race was held in two parts as rain caused its interruption; race times from the two heats were added together to determine the final results.

125 cc classification

Championship standings after the race (500cc)

Below are the standings for the top five riders and constructors after round twelve has concluded.

Riders' Championship standings

Constructors' Championship standings

 Note: Only the top five positions are included for both sets of standings.

References

Valencian Community motorcycle Grand Prix
Valencian
Valencian Community Motorcycle Grand Prix
21st century in Valencia
September 2001 sports events in Europe